In mathematics, and more specifically in ring theory, Krull's theorem, named after Wolfgang Krull, asserts that a nonzero ring has at least one maximal ideal.  The theorem was proved in 1929 by Krull, who used transfinite induction.  The theorem admits a simple proof using Zorn's lemma, and in fact is equivalent to Zorn's lemma, which in turn is equivalent to the axiom of choice.

Variants
 For noncommutative rings, the analogues for maximal left ideals and maximal right ideals also hold.
 For pseudo-rings, the theorem holds for regular ideals.
 A slightly stronger (but equivalent) result, which can be proved in a similar fashion, is as follows:  
Let R be a ring, and let I be a proper ideal of R.  Then there is a maximal ideal of R containing I.  
This result implies the original theorem, by taking I to be the zero ideal (0).  Conversely, applying the original theorem to R/I leads to this result.
To prove the stronger result directly, consider the set S of all proper ideals of R containing I.  The set S is nonempty since I ∈ S.  Furthermore, for any chain T of S, the union of the ideals in T is an ideal J, and a union of ideals not containing 1 does not contain 1, so J ∈ S.  By Zorn's lemma, S has a maximal element M.  This M is a maximal ideal containing I.

Krull's Hauptidealsatz 

Another theorem commonly referred to as Krull's theorem:  
Then every minimal prime ideal  containing  has height 1.

Notes

References 

Ideals (ring theory)